Lene Egeli (born 27 March 1987 in Stavanger, Norway) is a Norwegian beauty pageant contestant and model who won the title of Frøken Norge (Miss Norway) 2008, on 21 April 2008. She went on to represent Norway in Miss World 2008 in Johannesburg, South Africa, on 13 December 2008.  She did not advance to the semi-final

Egeli competed in Norway's Next Top Model in 2006, in which she placed as the 1st runner-up; Årets Ansikt ("Face of the Year") in 2004, in which she placed as the 2nd runner-up and the people's choice; and a modeling contest in China.  She also made a television commercial for the American cosmetics company Revlon.

She has completed high school and has worked as an assistant teacher and model.

References

External links
 Norway Top Model Profile

1987 births
Norwegian female models
Living people
Miss World 2008 delegates
People from Stavanger
Top Model finalists
Norwegian beauty pageant winners